Buinen is a village in the Dutch province of Drenthe. It is a part of the municipality of Borger-Odoorn, and lies about 18 km north of Emmen.

History 
The village was first mentioned in 1549 as Bunne. The etymology is unclear. Buinen is an esdorp from the Middle Ages which developed as a satellite of Borger. The elongated village has no church or brink (village square).

Buinen was home to 260 people in 1840. Between 1905 and 1945, there was a railway station in Buinen on the Zwolle to Stadskanaal railway line. The building was demolished in 1961. The railway line and harbour resulted in some growth until about 1940. In 1977, the harbour was filled up.

Gallery

References

Populated places in Drenthe
Borger-Odoorn